

Summit Racing Equipment Sportsman Series Calendar

Broadcasting Coverage 
The Summit Racing Equipment Sportsman Series  will aired on SBS Speedweek on Sundays and replays via SBS On Demand or online through ANDRA Catch Up TV, Speedweek.com.au and Motorsports TV. Selected events will be live streamed online as part of the Garmin VIRB ANDRA Drag Racing Live Stream starting with the Rowe Memorial Super Stock Classic on November 19.

Results 

*Super Comp is a combined bracket for Competition, Super Stock and Super Compact where there is an under subscribed field.

See also

Motorsport in Australia
List of Australian motor racing series

References

External links

Drag racing events
2016 in Australian motorsport
2017 in Australian motorsport